There have been 54 Formula One drivers from Germany including three world champions. Michael Schumacher holds many records in F1 including the most world championship titles and the most consecutive titles. In 2008 Sebastian Vettel became the youngest ever driver to win a race (which was later broken) and, in 2010, became the youngest world championship winner. In 2016, Nico Rosberg became the third driver from Germany to win the F1 World Drivers' Championship. There is currently one active German race driver in Formula One.

World champions and race winners
Since the first season in 1950 Germany has produced three F1 World Drivers' Champions. The first title did not come until 1994 when Michael Schumacher claimed his first of seven championship victories. Sebastian Vettel is the second German drivers' champion, winning back-to-back titles in 2010, 2011, 2012 and 2013. Nico Rosberg is the third German drivers' champion, winning the title in 2016.

There have been seven race winners from Germany, with Michael Schumacher having by far the most victories (91). Vettel scored 53 wins and Nico Rosberg won 23. Ralf Schumacher won six Grands Prix and Heinz-Harald Frentzen won three. Wolfgang von Trips, who became the first German driver to win a Grand Prix, won two races, both of which were in 1961. Jochen Mass won one.

Active drivers 
Nico Hülkenberg joined F1 in 2010, replacing Rosberg in the Williams team. Despite some good performances he was dropped by the team for the following season and he became a test driver for Force India. For the 2012 season he was given a race seat, and he went on to achieve his career best result at the 2012 Belgian Grand Prix, finishing fourth. In , he drove three races for Racing Point, replacing drivers who were ill. In , he drove two races for Aston Martin, replacing Sebastian Vettel, who was suffering from COVID-19.

Former drivers

Notable former drivers

Michael Schumacher has often been listed as one of the greatest drivers in the history of Formula One and the "most dominant driver in the history of the sport". He is statistically the best driver, holding many records including the most world championships, most fastest laps, most points, and formerly held the record for most pole positions and most wins (both surpassed by Lewis Hamilton). He won an unprecedented seven world championship titles, firstly in 1994 and then his second in 1995. Those titles came while Schumacher was a driver for Benetton but in 1996 he left to join Ferrari, a team who were, at the time, in disarray and without a champion driver since 1979. Over the next few seasons Schumacher and Ferrari saw some success and some controversy, including his disqualification from the 1997 season. However, the combination eventually proved highly successful and Schumacher won five consecutive championships between 2000 and 2004. Many of Schumacher's records are believed unlikely to ever be surpassed.

 World Champion Nico Rosberg, the son of 1982 World Champion Keke Rosberg, drove for Germany even though his father represented Finland. He joined Formula One as a driver with Williams before moving to Mercedes in 2010.  He scored his first pole position at the 2012 Chinese Grand Prix and held on to win the race. He became the second son of a former champion to win a title.

Stefan Bellof has been described as the "ultimate 'what-might-have-been' driver". He joined Formula One in 1984, the same year that saw Ayrton Senna join the sport. Senna's performance at the 1984 Monaco Grand Prix marked him out as an immensely talented driver, but Bellof's race had shown what potential the German had as well. Starting last on a very wet grid, Bellof quickly rose through the order, passing seven cars by the end of the first lap. He was in fourth place when the race was stopped due to safety concerns brought on by the weather. It would prove to be his best result in Formula One and, in 1985, Bellof died at the Circuit de Spa-Francorchamps while competing in the World Sportscar Championship. Former teammate Martin Brundle later said of Bellof "as it is with Ayrton, the good ones are taken from us far too young".

Ralf Schumacher, younger brother of Michael, won six Grands Prix in a career that spanned eleven F1 seasons starting in 1997. All six wins came in the middle of his F1 career as a driver for Williams. Heinz-Harald Frentzen won three Grands Prix over ten seasons, twice finishing in third place in the drivers' championship. Nick Heidfeld holds the record for the most podium finishes without a win (13).

Timo Glock was the third driver for Jordan in 2004 and was called up for racing duty when Giorgio Pantano was unable to drive due to a sponsorship dispute. Glock finished 7th, becoming one of only a handful of drivers who have scored championship points on their debut. It would prove to be Glock's only race in that season and he would not return to F1 until 2008.

He is the youngest driver to win the title. Vettel is seen as one of the greatest qualifiers in the sport and holds the record for the most consecutive front row starts, having qualified in first or second at 25 consecutive races. Vettel retired at the end of the 2022 season to focus on his family. At his last race at Abu Dhabi, the entire grid and staff ran a marathon race as a goodbye to the four-time World Champion.

Other former drivers
Additional to those detailed above the following drivers are worthy of note: 

Jochen Mass
Hans-Joachim Stuck
Rolf Stommelen
Joachim Winkelhock
Manfred Winkelhock
Markus Winkelhock
Christian Danner
Wolfgang von Trips
Hans Herrmann
Karl Kling
Wolfgang Seidel

See also
Formula One drivers from East Germany
List of Formula One Grand Prix winners

References